Joseph Adams Barbee (August 30, 1933 – August 12, 1969) was a college and professional American football defensive tackle. He played college football at Kent State, and played professionally in the American Football League for the Oakland Raiders in 1960.

See also
List of American Football League players

External links
Stats

1933 births
1969 deaths
Players of American football from Cleveland
American football defensive tackles
Kent State Golden Flashes football players
Oakland Raiders players
American Football League players